Lanchester may refer to:

Places
Lanchester, County Durham, a village in England
Lanchester Polytechnic, former name of Coventry University

People
Ann Margaret Lanchester (fl. 1803), British fashion designer
Edith Lanchester (1871-1966), English socialist and suffragette
Elsa Lanchester (1902–1986), Oscar-nominated English character actress
Frederick W. Lanchester (1868–1946), engineer who devised Lanchester's laws and founded Lanchester Motor Company
Lanchester's laws, mathematical formulae for calculating the strength of military forces
Henry Jones Lanchester (1834-1914), English architect
Henry Vaughan Lanchester (1863–1953), architect and brother of Frederick W
John Lanchester (born 1962), British journalist and novelist
William Forster Lanchester (1875–1953), British zoologist

Other uses
Lanchester Motor Company, a now defunct Birmingham car manufacturer
Lanchester armoured car, of World War I
Lanchester 6×4 armoured car, post World War I
Lanchester submachine gun, used primarily by the Royal Navy in the Second World War

See also 
Lancaster (disambiguation)